Bhale Bullodu  is a 1995 Telugu-language comedy drama film, produced by V. B. Rajendra Prasad under the Jagapathi Art Pictures banner and directed by Sarath. It stars Jagapathi Babu, Soundarya  and music composed by Koti.

Plot
The film begins at a central jail where Jayanti is convicted of life for slaying her lover Krishna Mohan Rao. Following, she gives birth to baby boy Chinna in prison and names sentry Shantamma as his guardian. Plus, she needs to safeguard him from her malevolent maternal uncle Papa Rao & his son Hari who beset her for the property. Besides, Krishna is a chronic bachelor and misogynist owing to the past of his elder sibling no other than Krishna Mohan Rao. Radha, a fine girl admires his attitude and falls for him, on behalf of his turndown. 

Presently, Chinna is 10 years old, ahead Shantamma is aging and her health deteriorates. Hence, Jayanti asks Shantamma to do one thing when she presents Krishna as his father before Chinna by facing away. Therefrom, he pursues him as white on rice and Krishna whacks to dispose of him but fails. At length, he admits him to an orphanage. Meanwhile, as Radha's irk rises day by day Krishna takes her to the task. As a result, she attempts suicide when Krishna reciprocates realizing her true adoration. During the time of their wedding, Chinna lands with all pieces of evidence and verifies Krishna as his father. Now Krishna is legally enforced to take care of Chinna which bedevils him and creates a rift in his marital life. Thus, vexed Krishna dumps Chinna far away in a forest but later discerns his error. 

In the interim, Chinna spots Papa Rao & Hari slaughtering a person in the forest, takes the heels, and they behind him. Anyhow, Krishna retrieves Chinna and eventually, dotes on him. Afterward, Krishna traces the Shantamma who is lying in an ailing position. Before leaving her breath, she divulges that Chinna is not his son but fails to proclaim the actuality. Listening to it, Radha recognizes her husband's integrity. Whereas, Chinna regrets and silently quits the house. Perturbed Krishna announces a paper advertisement to find the whereabouts of Chinna. Viewing it, Jayanti absconds from the prison to rescue her son. Moreover, Papa Rao discovers that Jayanti's son and the kid who witnessed to their crime are the same and ploys to eliminate him. Soon, Krishna & Jayanti approaches Chinna when she states he is the progeny of his brother. Indeed, Papa Rao is the true killer that murdered Krishna Mohana Rao and incriminated Jayanti. Being cognizant of it, Krishna conveys his apology to Jayanti and accepts her as his sister-in-law. Consequently, Papa Rao & Hari attacks them and a brawl erupts. At last, Krishna ceases the virulent, but tragically, Jayanti sacrifices her life while guarding Chinna. Finally, the movie ends on a happy note with Krishna & Radha fostering Chinna.

Cast

Jagapathi Babu as Krishna 
Soundarya as Radha
Jayasudha as Jayanti
Kota Srinivasa Rao as Papa Rao
Srihari as Hari
Allu Ramalingaiah as Radha's grandfather 
Babu Mohan as Chemcha Bhima Rao
Sudhakar as Balu
Tanikella Bharani as S.I. Kubakonam Kanda Swamy
Giri Babu as Krishna's paternal uncle
Chalapathi Rao as Mataiah
Raja as Krishna Mohan Rao
Mada as a broker
Jayalalita as Nandivardhanam
Silk Smitha as item number
Disco Shanthi as item number
Kalpana Rai as Parijatam
Nirmalamma as Santhamma
Master Prabhu as Chinna

Soundtrack

Music composed by Koti. Music released on Supreme Music Company.

References

External links 
 

1995 films
1990s Telugu-language films
Indian romantic drama films
1995 romantic drama films
Films directed by Sarath
Films scored by Koti